Varangaon is a town in Jalgaon district of Maharashtra in India. It is situated  in Bhusawal taluka.

Geography
A river, Bhogvati, flows through the town. Bhogvati later joins the Tapi River near Bhusaval. The Hatnur Dam, is present 11 km north on the River Tapi, provides water to the town.

Economics
The Ordnance Factory of Varangaon of the Ordnance Factories Board.It manufactures gunpowder and similar military products for the Indian Armed Forces is located in Varangaon.  Varangaon railway station falls on the Mumbai–Howrah rail route.

Demographics 
AS per Indian census 2011, the population of Varangaon was 35,411. Out of these 18385 were male and 17026 were famale.

Religion 
Nageshwar Temple is situated on the outskirts of the town, which is an ancient Shiva temple. It is believed that the Maratha Sardar Bajirao Peshva paid his tributes to this temple, before marching on to Delhi and the Mughal Sultanate. Muktai Temple of Mehun Muktainagar is also nearby.

Economy 
Farming is the main source of income of the majority of the people. Sugarcane, banana, cotton and jowar are the main crops, taken twice a year in both harvests. The fields are irrigated by water from the River Tapi.

References

Cities and towns in Jalgaon district
Talukas in Maharashtra